The 1968 United States presidential election in North Carolina took place on November 5, 1968, and was part of the 1968 United States presidential election. Voters chose 13 representatives, or electors to the Electoral College, who voted for president and vice president.

Whereas in the Deep South, Black Belt whites had deserted the national Democratic Party in 1948, in North Carolina, where they had historically been an economically liberalizing influence on the state Democratic Party, the white landowners of the Black Belt had stayed exceedingly loyal to the party until after the Voting Rights Act. This allowed North Carolina to be alongside Arkansas the only state to vote for Democrats in all four presidential elections between 1952 and 1964. Indeed, the state had not voted Republican since anti-Catholic fervor lead it to support Herbert Hoover over Al Smith in 1928; and other than that the state had not voted Republican once in the century since the reconstruction era election of 1872. Nonetheless, in 1964 Republican Barry Goldwater won a small majority of white voters, although he was beaten by virtually universal support for incumbent President Lyndon Johnson by a black vote estimated at 175,000. However, with the Voting Rights Act's passage, a reaction set in amongst these, and indeed amongst almost all Southern poor whites outside the unionized coalfields of Appalachia. Former Alabama Governor George Wallace, running in North Carolina under the moniker of the “American Party”, appealed very strongly to most white voters in the eastern half of the state who had become extremely critical of black protesters, student radicals, and rising crime rates.

In early polls it was thought that Wallace would carry the state, but a major swing against him and toward Republican nominee Richard Nixon during October and November saw Nixon win the state, with 39.5% of the vote, whilst Wallace's 31.3% still pushed Democratic nominee and incumbent Vice-President Hubert Humphrey into third on 29.2%. The Alabama segregationist carried almost all of the Piedmont and Outer Banks, and some Black Belt areas where black voter registration was still limited – the very areas that had allowed John F. Kennedy and Adlai Stevenson II to carry North Carolina when other Outer South states went Republican. In these previously loyal regions whites felt President Johnson had moved much too far on civil rights issues, and consequent support for highly segregationist candidates in Democratic primary elections led them naturally to Wallace. Humphrey had very limited support outside of black voters, who were estimated to comprise well over half his total vote in the state, with his share of the white vote totaling less than 20 percent and coming mainly from some traditionally Democratic mountain counties and the university communities of Orange and Durham counties.

Nixon won twelve of the state's electoral votes, while one faithless elector that had been pledged to Nixon voted instead for Wallace. , this is the last election in which Wayne County and Lenoir County did not vote for the Republican presidential candidate.

This is one of five states, alongside Georgia, Arkansas, Tennessee, and South Carolina in which Hubert Humphrey came in third place. Alongside Richard Nixon's third place finishes in Alabama, Mississippi, and Louisiana, it is the penultimate election in which a Republican or Democrat placed third (the final being in Maine and Utah in 1992, where Ross Perot's strong showing forced George H.W. Bush and Bill Clinton, respectively, into third place).

Results

Results by county

Notes

References

North Carolina
1968
1968 North Carolina elections